The 2023 Northwest Territories Men's Curling Championship, the men's territorial curling championship for the Northwest Territories, was held from February 1 to 5 at the Fort Smith Curling and Winter Sports Centre in Fort Smith, Northwest Territories. The winning Jamie Koe rink represented the Northwest Territories at the 2023 Tim Hortons Brier in London, Ontario where they finished eighth in Pool A with a 1–7 record.

Teams
The teams are listed as follows:.

Round-robin standings
Final Standings

Round-robin results
All draw times are listed in Mountain Standard Time (UTC−07:00).

Draw 1
Wednesday, February 1, 7:00 pm

Draw 2
Thursday, February 2, 2:00 pm

Draw 3
Thursday, February 2, 7:00 pm

Draw 4
Friday, February 3, 2:00 pm

Draw 5
Friday, February 3, 7:00 pm

Draw 6
Saturday, February 4, 9:00 am

Playoffs
Source:

Semifinal
Saturday February 4, 2:00 pm

Final
Sunday, February 5, 10:00 am

References

Northwest Territories
Curling in the Northwest Territories
February 2023 sports events in Canada
2023 in the Northwest Territories
South Slave Region